Merthyr Tydfil College (Welsh: Y Coleg Merthyr Tudful) is a further education college located in Merthyr Tydfil, Wales. From May 2006 to April 2013, it was a constituent college of the University of Glamorgan and thereafter, a college of the University of South Wales.

Previously, the college was an independent institution, but became part of the University of Glamorgan Group in May 2006. Although it is a constituent college of the university, Merthyr Tydfil College is not officially part of the university. It is run by the University of South Wales as a separate organization, primarily focused on offering further education to the local community in Merthyr Tydfil.

The college provides a range of courses to students from the local area, including GCSEs, A Levels, BTECs, Apprenticeships and Access courses. Merthyr Tydfil College also offers a limited provision of higher education courses in conjunction with the University of South Wales.

Gallery of Photos (Interior and Exterior)

Notable alumni

 Gerrion Jones, Art Collector

External links
 Merthyr Tydfil College Homepage
 Old Merthyr Tydfil: Merthyr Tydfil College - Historical Photographs of Merthyr Tydfil College.

University of South Wales
University of Glamorgan
Further education colleges in Merthyr Tydfil